Packing fraction may refer to:

 Packing density, the fraction of the space filled by objects comprising the packing
 Atomic packing factor, the fraction of volume in a crystal structure that is occupied by the constituent particles
 Packing fraction (mass spectrometry), the atomic mass defect per nucleon